Anton Frank Maciejewski (January 3, 1893 – September 25, 1949) was an American businessman and politician who served as a U.S. Representative from Illinois from 1939 to 1942.

Biography
Born in Anderson, Texas, Maciejewski attended the public schools of Cicero, Illinois, and Lewis Institute, Chicago. He became engaged in the wholesale and retail coal business in Cicero, in 1916. He served as assistant agent in charge of relief of Cook County, Illinois from 1925 to 1928. He served as member of the Democratic State and National Committees. He served as a delegate to the Democratic National Convention in 1928, and as supervisor and treasurer of Cicero, Illinois from 1932 to 1939.

Congress 
Maciejewski was elected as a Democrat to the Seventy-sixth and Seventy-seventh Congresses and served from January 3, 1939, until his resignation on December 8, 1942. He was not a candidate for renomination in 1942.

Later career and death 
After his service in Congress, Maciejewski resumed the wholesale and retail coal business. He also engaged in the construction of defense housing.

Maciejewski was elected to the board of trustees of the sanitary district of Chicago in December 1942 and served until his death in Chicago, September 25, 1949. He was interred in Resurrection Cemetery, Justice, Illinois.

References

1893 births
1949 deaths
American politicians of Polish descent
Democratic Party members of the United States House of Representatives from Illinois
20th-century American politicians
People from Grimes County, Texas